Patrick Manogue (May 28, 1831 – February 27, 1895) was an Irish-born prelate of the Catholic Church in America.  He served as the founding bishop of the Diocese of Sacramento in California from 1886 until his death in 1895. He previously served as bishop of the Diocese of Grass Valley in California from 1881 until 1886.

Manogue was a pioneer of Catholicism in the Nevada Territory.

Biography

Early life 
Patrick Manogue was born in County Kilkenny, Ireland, in 1831. Emigrating to the United States, he left college to support his siblings. Manogue moved to Moore's Flat, California, where he prospected for gold. One of his fellow "ordinary miners", John Mackay, would spearhead the building of the Cathedral of the Blessed Sacrament starting in 1887.

After four years of prospecting, Manogue earned enough money to pay his tuition at Saint Sulpice Seminary, Paris. While at Saint Sulpice, Manogue admired its church; he would use it as a model for his future diocesan cathedral.

Priesthood 

Manogue was ordained to the priesthood on December 21, 1861. Bishop Eugene O'Connell chose him to start a ministry in the Nevada Territory. O'Connell felt that a former miner was best suited for a ministry to the growing Nevada mining community. Along with O'Connell, Manogue encouraged the Daughters of Charity to help populate pioneer churches in Nevada. Manogue built the "first St. Mary's in the Mountains" in 1862.

Coadjutor Bishop and Bishop of Grass Valley
On July 27, 1880, Manogue was appointed as coadjutor bishop of the Diocese of Grass Valley. He was consecrated bishop on January 16, 1881, by Archbishop Joseph Sadoc Alemany y Conill. His principal co-consecrators were Archbishop Francisco Mora y Borrell and Bishop O'Connell.

On February 29, 1884, Manogue succeeded O'Connell as the second and last diocesan bishop of Grass Valley. Manogue served two years as its final diocesan bishop.

Bishop of Sacramento
On May 28, 1886, the Vatican merged the Diocese of Grass Valley into the newly erected Diocese of Sacramento.  Manogue became its founding bishop and in effect the second bishop of the Sacramento diocese. The new diocese needed a cathedral and with help of Mackay and other influential miners, Manogue built his cathedral on land donated by the first governor of California, Peter Burnett.

Death and legacy 
Patrick Manogue died in the Cathedral of the Blessed Sacrament rectory in Sacramento on February 27, 1895.

Bishop Manogue Assembly 50, Knights of Columbus, was named in honor of this bishop. Because of his pioneering work in Nevada, Bishop Manogue High School in Reno was dedicated in his name. Bishop Manogue High School, a former female school in the Sacramento Diocese, was named for this Bishop. This school was merged with Christian Brothers High School which hosted a "Bishop Manogue Derby Day" celebrating the Kentucky Derby at the second annual Bishop Manogue H.S. reunion on May 1, 2010.

Notes

References

Further reading 

 
 
 
 
 
 
 

1831 births
1895 deaths
Roman Catholic bishops of Sacramento
Roman Catholic bishops of Grass Valley
19th-century Roman Catholic bishops in the United States
People from County Kilkenny
Irish emigrants to the United States (before 1923)
Seminary of Saint-Sulpice (France) alumni